Salvinorin A is the main active psychotropic molecule in Salvia divinorum. Salvinorin A is considered a dissociative hallucinogen.

It is structurally distinct from other naturally occurring hallucinogens (such as DMT, psilocybin, and mescaline) because it contains no nitrogen atoms; hence, it is not an alkaloid (and cannot be rendered as a salt), but rather is a terpenoid. It also differs in subjective experience, compared to other hallucinogens, and has been described as dissociative.

Salvinorin A can produce psychoactive experiences in humans with a typical duration of action being several minutes to an hour or so, depending on the method of ingestion.

Salvinorin A is found with several other structurally related salvinorins. Salvinorin is a trans-neoclerodane diterpenoid. It acts as a kappa opioid receptor agonist and is the first known compound acting on this receptor that is not an alkaloid.

History 

Salvinorin A was first described and named in 1982 by Alfredo Ortega and colleagues in Mexico. They used a combination of spectroscopy and x-ray crystallography to determine the chemical structure of the compound, which was shown to have a bicyclic diterpene structure. Around the same time, Leander Julián Valdés III independently isolated the molecule as part of his PhD research, published in 1983. Valdés named the chemical divinorin, and also isolated an analog that he named divinorin B. The naming was subsequently corrected to salvinorin A and B after the work was published in 1984. Valdés later isolated salvinorin C.

Pharmacology 

Salvinorin A is a trans-neoclerodane diterpenoid with the chemical formula C23H28O8. Unlike other known opioid-receptor ligands, salvinorin A is not an alkaloid, as it does not contain a basic nitrogen atom. Salvinorin A has no action at the 5-HT2A serotonin receptor, the principal molecular target responsible for the actions of 'classical' psychedelics such as LSD and mescaline. Salvinorin A has also been shown to have effect on cannabinoid CB1 receptors. It significantly increases prolactin and inconsistently increases cortisol. It causes dysphoria by stopping release of dopamine in the striatum. Salvinorin A increases activity of DAT while decreasing activity of SERT.

Pharmacokinetics 
Salvinorin A is effectively deactivated by the gastrointestinal system, so alternative routes of administration must be used for better absorption. It is absorbed by oral mucosa.
It has a half-life of around 8 minutes in non-human primates.

Potency and selectivity 

Salvinorin A is active at doses as low as 200 µg. Synthetic chemicals, such as LSD (active at 20–30 µg doses), can be more potent. Research has shown that salvinorin A is a potent κ-opioid receptor (KOR) agonist (Ki = 2.4 nM, EC50 = 1.8 nM). It has a high affinity for the receptor, indicated by the low dissociation constant of 1.0 nanomolar (nM). It has been reported that the effects of salvinorin A in mice are blocked by κ-opioid receptor antagonists. In addition, salvinorin A has recently been found to act as a D2 receptor partial agonist, with an affinity of 5–10 nM, an intrinsic activity of 40–60%, and an EC50 of 48 nM. This suggests that the D2 receptor may also play an important role in its effects. Salvinorin A shows atypical properties as an agonist of the KOR relative to other KOR agonists. For instance, it is 40-fold less potent in promoting internalization (receptor downregulation) of the human KOR relative to the prototypical KOR agonist U-50488.

Effect on intestinal motility 

Salvinorin A is capable of inhibiting excess intestinal motility (e.g. diarrhea), through its potent κ-opioid-activating effects. The mechanism of action for salvinorin A on ileal tissue has been described as 'prejunctional', as it was able to modify electrically induced contractions, but not those of exogenous acetylcholine. A pharmacologically important aspect of the contraction-reducing properties of ingested salvinorin A on gut tissue is that it is only pharmacologically active on inflamed and not normal tissue, thus reducing possible side-effects.

Solubility 

Salvinorin A is soluble in organic solvents such as ethanol and acetone, but not especially so in water.

Detection in urine 

Researchers found that humans who smoked 580 μg of the pure drug had urine salvinorin A concentrations of 2.4–10.9 µg/L during the first hour; the levels fell below the detection limit by 1.5 hours after smoking.

Research 

Salvinorin A has only been administered to humans in a few studies, one showing that its effects peaked at about 2 minutes, that its subjective effects may overlap with those of serotonergic psychedelics, and that it temporarily impairs recall and recognition memory. Like most other agonists of kappa opioid receptors, salvinorin A produces sedation, psychotomimesis, dysphoria, anhedonia, and depression. Salvinorin A has been screened for its possible use as a structural "scaffold" in medicinal chemistry in developing new drugs for treating psychiatric diseases such as cocaine dependence.

Synthesis

Biosynthesis 

The biogenic origin of salvinorin A synthesis has been elucidated using nuclear magnetic resonance and ESI-MS analysis of incorporated precursors labeled with stable isotopes of carbon (carbon-13 13C) and hydrogen (deuterium 2H). It "is biosynthesized via the 1-deoxy-d-xylulose-5-phosphate pathway", rather than the classic mevalonate pathway, consistent with the common plastidial localization of diterpenoid metabolism.

Terpenoids are biosynthesized from two 5-carbon precursors, isopentenyl diphosphate (IPP) and dimethylallyl diphosphate (DMAPP). The NMR and MS study by Zjawiony suggested that the biosynthesis of salvinorin A proceeds via the 1-deoxy-d-xylulose-5-phosphate pathway. In the deoxyxylulose phosphate pathway, D-glyceraldehyde 3-phosphate and pyruvate, the intermediates of the glycolysis, are converted into 1-deoxy-D-xylulose 5-phosphate via decarboxylation. Subsequent reduction with NADPH generates 2C-methyl-D-erythritol 2,4-cyclodiphosphate, via the intermediates 4-diphosphocytidyl-2-C-methyl-D-erythritol and 4-diphosphocytidyl-2c-methyl-d-erythritol-2-phosphate, which then lead to IPP and DMAPP.

Subsequent addition of three 5-carbon IPP units to a single 5-carbon DMAPP unit generates the 20-carbon central precursor, geranylgeranyl diphosphate (GGPP). Bicyclization of GGPP by the class II diterpene synthase, ent-clerodienyl diphosphate synthase (SdCPS2), produces a labdanyl diphosphate carbocation, which is subsequently rearranged through a sequence of 1,2-hydride and methyl shifts to form the ent-clerodienyl diphosphate intermediate. SdCPS2 catalyzes the first committed reaction in the biosynthesis of salvinorin A by producing its characteristic clerodane scaffold. A series of oxygenation, acylation and methylation reactions is then required to complete the biosynthesis of salvinorin A.

Similar to many plant-derived psychoactive compounds, salvinorin A is excreted via peltate glandular trichomes, which reside external to the epidermis.

Chemical synthesis 
A total asymmetric synthesis of salvinorin A, which relies on a transannular Michael reaction cascade to construct the ring system, was achieved as a 4.5% overall yield over 30 steps, then revised using 24 steps to yield salvinorin A in 0.15% yield. An approach to the trans-decalin ring system of salvinorin A used an intramolecular Diels-Alder reaction/Tsuji allylation strategy, and a total synthesis of salvinorin A was achieved using the intramolecular Diels-Alder / Tsuji allylation approach, combined with an asymmetric late-stage addition of the furan moiety.

Associated compounds 

Salvinorin A is one of several structurally related salvinorins found in the Salvia divinorum plant. Salvinorin A is the only naturally occurring salvinorin that is known to be psychoactive. Salvinorin A can be synthesized from salvinorin B by acetylation, and de-acetylated salvinorin A becomes analog to salvinorin B.

Research has produced a number of semi-synthetic compounds. Most derivatives are selective kappa opioid agonists as with salvinorin A, although some are even more potent, with the most potent compound salvinorin B ethoxymethyl ether being ten times stronger than salvinorin A. Some derivatives, such as herkinorin, reduce kappa opioid action and instead act as mu opioid agonists.

The synthetic derivative RB-64 is notable because of its functional selectivity and potency. Salvinorin B methoxymethyl ether is seven times more potent than salvinorin A at KOPr in GTP-γS assays.

Natural occurrence 
Salvinorin A occurs naturally in several Salvia species:

 S. divinorum (0.89mg/g to 3.70mg/g). 
 S. recognita (212.9 μg/g).
 S. cryptantha (51.5 μg/g).
 S. glutinosa (38.9 μg/g).

Salvinorin B has been detected in S. potentillifolia and S. adenocaulon, however these species do not contain a measureable amount of salvinorin A.

Legal status 

Salvinorin A is sometimes regulated together with its host, Salvia divinorum, due to its psychoactive and analgesic effects.

United States
Salvinorin A is not scheduled at the federal level in the United States. Its molecular structure is unlike any Schedule I or II drug, so possession or sales is unlikely to be prosecuted under the Federal Analogue Act.

Florida
"Salvinorin A" is a Schedule I controlled substance in the state of Florida making it illegal to buy, sell, or possess in Florida. There is an exception however for "any drug product approved by the United States Food and Drug Administration which contains salvinorin A or its isomers, esters, ethers, salts, and salts of isomers, esters, and ethers, if the existence of such isomers, esters, ethers, and salts is possible within the specific chemical designation."

Australia
Salvinorin A is considered a Schedule 9 prohibited substance in Australia under the Poisons Standard (October 2015). A Schedule 9 substance is a substance which may be abused or misused, the manufacture, possession, sale or use of which should be prohibited by law except when required for medical or scientific research, or for analytical, teaching or training purposes with approval of Commonwealth and/or State or Territory Health Authorities.

Sweden
Sveriges riksdags health ministry Statens folkhälsoinstitut classified salvinorin A (and Salvia divinorum) as "health hazard" under the act Lagen om förbud mot vissa hälsofarliga varor (translated Act on the Prohibition of Certain Goods Dangerous to Health) as of April 1, 2006, in their regulation SFS 2006:167 listed as "salvinorin A", making it illegal to sell or possess.

See also 
 Psychoactive drug
 List of entheogens
 Collybolide
 Nalfurafine
 Difelikefalin
 Enadoline

References

Further reading 

 

Dissociative drugs
Entheogens
Kappa-opioid receptor agonists
D2-receptor agonists
Oneirogens
Terpenes and terpenoids
3-Furyl compounds
Acetate esters
Lactones
Methyl esters
Oxygen heterocycles
Heterocyclic compounds with 3 rings